Hippocampus guttulatus, commonly known as the long-snouted seahorse and in Great Britain as the spiny seahorse, is a marine fish belonging to the family Syngnathidae, native from the northeast Atlantic, including the Mediterranean.

Synonyms
H. hippocampus microstephanus Slastenenko 1937; H. hippocampus microcoronatus Slastenenko 1938; H. guttulatus multiannularis Ginsburg 1937; H biscuspis Kaup 1856.

Description
The body is slender, the snout is long and the tail is prehensile.
Its head and dorsal ridge have often some more or less long and numerous dermal filaments which can be simple or bifid.
Its color ranges from dark green to different variants of brown to yellow, and the body is often speckled with small white dots.

Advances in technology have led forensic scientists to closely discover the geographic origin of the hippocampus guttulatus based on the fingerprints of their bony structures

Distribution and habitat
The long-snouted seahorse is widespread throughout the temperate waters of the eastern Atlantic Ocean from the south coast of the United Kingdom to the Netherlands and south to Morocco, including the Canary Islands, the Azores and Madeira, and the Mediterranean Sea. Along the south coast of England and south-west Wales at depths of 1-20 , specially in eelgrass meadows, clinging by the tail or swimming upright. 

The longsnout seahorse ranges from black to yellow, red, orange and brown with multiple white dots usually on the tail.

It occurs close by Posidonia and eelgrass meadows or in mixed habitat with sandy bottom and rocks with algae.

Based on a experiment conducted form the Department of Ecology and Marine Resources by Sonia Valladares and Miquel Planas, the survival rate of the young hippocampus guttulatus that lived in the Artemia decreased, as opposed to the younglings in the copepods

Biology
The long-snouted seahorse has a carnivorous diet and feeds on small crustaceans, larvae, fish eggs and other planktonic organisms.
It is ovoviviparous and it is the male who broods the eggs in its ventral brood pouch. The latter includes villi rich in capillaries that surround each fertilized egg, creating a sort of placenta supplying the embryos. When fully grown, pups will be expelled from the pocket and mature in complete autonomy. Many seahorse species are monogamous as mating occurs between the same two partners in one breeding season. However, the mating habits for H. guttulatus are unknown. A interesting aspect of seahorse coloration is the ability to rapidly transform color patterns to blend with their immediate surroundings. They swim upright and avoid predators by mimicking the colour of underwater plants.

Temperature has a huge effect on the development of organisms at an early age, which was seen when tested on newborn hippocampus guttulatus, where the isotopic signatures were different from the ones that were fed food vs. ones that weren’t

Conservation status
The long-snouted seahorse is relatively rare, and limited data exist on its population and about the volume and the impact of trade for traditional Chinese medicine and for the aquarium. The species is therefore considered as "Data Deficient" on the IUCN Red List.
Internationally, it is also listed in Appendix II of the Convention on International Trade in Endangered Species of Wild Fauna and Flora (CITES). This means that it is on the list of species not necessarily threatened with extinction, but for which trade must be controlled in order to avoid utilization incompatible with their survival. There were great concerns of the reduction of genetic diversity among hippocampus guttulatus, local to the North-East Atlantic region, where the population size decrease between 2001 and 2008

See also 
 Hippocampus hippocampus

References

External links
 

Marine fish of Europe
Fish of the Mediterranean Sea
Fish of the Black Sea
Taxa named by Georges Cuvier
Fish described in 1829
Hippocampus (genus)
Taxonomy articles created by Polbot